Saint Edith or St Edith's or variant, may refer to:

People
Edith of Polesworth (died 15 March AD 871)
Edith of Wilton (961 – 15 September 984)
Edith of Aylesbury, a Dark Ages English saint
Saint Edith Stein (1891–1942), a German Jewish convert and martyr

Other uses
 St Edith Hall, Kemsing, Kent, UK
 St Edith's Church, Eaton-under-Heywood
 St Edith's Church, Shocklach

See also

 
 
 
 
 Edith 
 Saint (disambiguation)
 Saint Editha (disambiguation)